Paywall: The Business of Scholarship is a 2018 American documentary film directed by Jason Schmitt. It documents the high profits and business practices of the academic publishing industry and the efforts of the open access movement to reform it. The film premiered at the Landmark Theater (E-Street) in Washington, DC on September 5, 2018, and was subsequently freely released online under a Creative Commons license in keeping with the spirit of the film.

Reception
The documentary has received reviews in many outlets including Inside Higher Ed, Nature, New Scientist, Endeavour, and Research Features.

Budget

To support the filmmaker and his team to create this film and release it online for free, it received funding support from a charitable grant from Open Society Foundations.

References

External links 
 Official Website
 

Academic publishing
American documentary films
2018 films
2010s English-language films
2010s American films